The Mangareva reed warbler or astrolabe reed warbler (Acrocephalus astrolabii) is a presumed extinct songbird that existed on Mangareva in the Gambier Islands. It is known from only two specimens, and is believed to have gone extinct in the mid-19th century.

References

Mangareva reed warbler
Birds of the Gambier Islands
Mangareva reed warbler